Sir William Fry,  (8 September 1858 – 30 March 1934) was a British Army officer who served in the Second Boer War and the First world war, and later became Lieutenant Governor of the Isle of Man.

Military career
Fry joined the British Army in May 1878, when he was commissioned a second lieutenant in the West Yorkshire Regiment. He served in the Second Anglo-Afghan War 1878–80, was promoted to lieutenant on 7 January 1880, to captain on 20 January 1886, and to major on 27 July 1898. After the outbreak of the Second Boer War in October 1899, he went with the 2nd battalion of his regiment to South Africa. The battalion was attached to the field force ordered to relieve the besieged town of Ladysmith in Natal, and as such he took part in the battles of Colenso (December 1899), Spion Kop (January 1900), Vaal Krantz and the Tugela Heights (February 1900). He assumed command of the battalion with the brevet rank of lieutenant-colonel on 23 February 1900, a week before the force relieved Ladysmith on 1 March 1900. The battalion stayed in Natal from March to June 1900, and took part in operations at Laing's Nek, then served in Transvaal from July that year. He stayed in South Africa until after the end of the war in June 1902, and left Cape Town on the SS Orient in October that year. For his service in the war he was mentioned in despatches, received the Queen's Medal with five clasps, and was appointed a Companion of the Order of the Bath (CB).

He was appointed Commandant of the Mounted Infantry School at Bulford in 1905, Brigadier General commanding the Lancashire Regiment District in 1907 and Commander of the East Lancashire Division in 1908. He went on to be Deputy Director General of the Territorial Force in 1910 and Commander of the 1st London Division of the Territorial Force in 1912. He served in World War I as Commander of 30th Division and then as Major-General in Charge of Administration in Ireland until his retirement in 1919. He was also Colonel of the West Yorkshire Regiment.

In retirement he became Lieutenant Governor of the Isle of Man in 1919. He lived at Winkfield in Berkshire.

Family
In 1886, he married Ellen Margaret Goldie-Taubman.

References

|-

|-

 

1858 births
1934 deaths
British Army generals of World War I
Knights Commander of the Royal Victorian Order
Companions of the Order of the Bath
Lieutenant Governors of the Isle of Man
West Yorkshire Regiment officers
British Army personnel of the Second Boer War
British military personnel of the Second Anglo-Afghan War
British Army major generals
Territorial Force officers